Galizia is an Italian surname which is most prevalent in the southeastern region of Apulia and is also to be found among the American, Brazilian and Argentinian Italian diaspora. Notable people with the surname include:
 Daphne Caruana Galizia (1964–2017), Maltese journalist, writer and critic
 Emanuele Luigi Galizia (1830–1907), Maltese architect and civil engineer
 Fede Galizia (c. 1574 – c. 1630), Italian Renaissance painter
 Joseph Galizia (1941–1998), American mobster of Italian descent

References

Italian-language surnames
Surnames of Italian origin